The Borrowed Wife is a 2014 Philippine television drama romance series broadcast by GMA Network. Directed by Gil Tejada Jr., it stars Camille Prats and Rafael Rosell. It premiered on January 20, 2014 on the network's Afternoon Prime line up. The series concluded on May 23, 2014 with a total of 88 episodes.

Cast and characters

Main cast
 Camille Prats as Sophia Gonzales / Maria Carlotta "Maricar" Perez-Santos
 Rafael Rosell as Ricardo "Rico" Santos

Supporting cast
 Charee Pineda as Maria Carlotta "Maricar" Perez-Santos / Sandra Navarro / Sylvia Ignacio
 TJ Trinidad as Eduardo "Earl" Villaraza
 Pauleen Luna as Tessa Pelaez
 Yayo Aguila as Imelda "Elda" Santos
 Sherilyn Reyes-Tan as Mimi Perez-Garcia
 Diego Castro as Carlo Solaez
 Rhed Bustamante as Joanna Santos
 Zarah Mae Deligero as Denden Garcia
 Jojit Lorenzo as Biboy Manalo

Guest cast
 Frances Makil-Ignacio as Olive
 Philip Lazaro as Mickey 
 Yassi Pressman as Wendy 
 Gian Magdangal as Gerard
 Mel Martinez as Pat
 Patricia Ismael as Bea
 JC Tiuseco as Larry
 Arthur Solinap as Rex

Ratings
According to AGB Nielsen Philippines' Mega Manila household television ratings, the pilot episode of The Borrowed Wife earned a 12.6% rating. While the final episode scored a 17.2% rating.

References

External links
 
 

2014 Philippine television series debuts
2014 Philippine television series endings
Filipino-language television shows
GMA Network drama series
Philippine romance television series
Television shows set in Quezon City